This is a list of released songs recorded by The Cranberries.

Songs

References 

Lists of songs recorded by Irish artists
The Cranberries songs
Irish music-related lists